Satyanarayan Sharma (born 17 January 1943) is an Indian politician, belonging to Indian National Congress. He is currently serving his 7th term as an MLA, representing Raipur City Gramin (Vidhan Sabha constituency) constituency, Chhattisgarh. He has earlier served as a Minister in Chhattisgarh and Madhya Pradesh. He was a pro-tem Speaker of the fourth legislative assembly of Chhattisgarh.

Background
Satyanarayan Sharma was born on 17 January 1943. He is the son of Jagdish Prasad Sharma and the great-grandson of freedom fighter and editor Jhabarmal Sharma.

Personal life 
He is married to Smt Nirmal Sharma. He has three sons.

Political career
He was first elected as an MLA in 1985 in the undivided Madhya Pradesh. Subsequently, he was elected an MLA 6 times in 1990, 1993, 1998, 2003, 2013, and 2018. He was appointed Minister of State (Independent Charge), Mineral Resources, Madhya Pradesh Government in 1995.

In 1998, he was elevated to Cabinet Minister of Commercial Tax (Sales Tax) and Public Relations in the Madhya Pradesh Government. In December 1998, after Assembly elections, he was made the Cabinet Minister for Commercial Tax (Sales Tax), Excise and Registration.

He was appointed Cabinet Minister for Education (School, Higher, and Technical), Human Resource Department, Culture and Science & Technology in the Chhattisgarh government in 2000.

He was in consideration of becoming the Chief Minister in 2018. Earlier, in 2000, when the state of Chhattisgarh was newly formed, he was in consideration of becoming the Chief Minister.

He currently represents Raipur City Gramin (Vidhan Sabha constituency) in Chhattisgarh Legislative Assembly.

Other positions held
Sharma was elected as Vice President of Bharat Scouts and Guides in 2013.
He is a member of the board of directors of the National Cooperative Housing Federation of India.

References 

1943 births
Living people
Indian National Congress politicians from Chhattisgarh
Chhattisgarh MLAs 2018–2023
Chhattisgarh MLAs 2013–2018
Chhattisgarh MLAs 2003–2008
Madhya Pradesh MLAs 1985–1990
Madhya Pradesh MLAs 1990–1992
Madhya Pradesh MLAs 1993–1998
Madhya Pradesh MLAs 1998–2003